Sollers Point is a 2017 American-French drama film written and directed by Matthew Porterfield. It stars McCaul Lombardi, Jim Belushi, Zazie Beetz, Tom Guiry and Marin Ireland.

Plot
 
Sollers Point tells the story of Keith (Lombardi), a twenty-four-year-old newly released from prison and living with his father (Belushi) under house arrest in Baltimore. Keith is struggling to reestablish himself, and break free of the bonds forged behind bars, within a community scarred by unemployment, neglect, and deeply entrenched segregation. His intentions are in the right place and he possesses an aggressive desire to get back on his feet, but as he taps into all his familiar resources, he finds that he may be reverting to his old ways.

Cast
 McCaul Lombardi as Keith
 Jim Belushi as Carol
 Zazie Beetz as Courtney
 Tom Guiry as Aaron
 Marin Ireland as Kate
 Everleigh Brenner as Jessie
 Imani Hakim as Candace
 Wass Stevens as Wasp
 Lynn Cohen as Ladybug
 Brieyon Bell-El as Marquis
 Kazy Tauginas as Gary
 Michael Rogers as Mom
 Ashley Shelton as Kelsey
 Grace Doughty as Kelly
Carlous Palmer as Graveyard worker
 Levi Amir Serkin-Ahmed as Baby by the pool

Production
In May 2016, it was announced McCaul Lombardi, Jim Belushi, Marin Ireland and Jurnee Smollett-Bell joined the cast of the film, with Matthew Porterfield directing from a screenplay he wrote.  Ryan Zacarias, Alexandra Byer, and Jordan Mintzer will serve as producers.

Filming
Principal photography began in August 2016, in Baltimore, Maryland.

Release and reception
The film had its world premiere at the San Sebastián International Film Festival on September 26, 2017. Shortly after, Oscilloscope Laboratories acquired U.S. distribution rights. It was released theatrically on May 18, 2018.

, 85% of the 27 critics reviews compiled on Rotten Tomatoes are positive, with an average rating of 6.85/10. Richard Brody, reviewing the film for The New Yorker, wrote: "[Sollers Point] plunges into some of the gravest and ugliest aspects of modern American life and pulls them to the fore in a chilling intimacy . . . . Porterfield gently but unshrinkingly touches some of the most inflamed and sensitive places of American society, including the relentless strains of racism, the threat of unemployment, the contraband economy, the horrors of incarceration, the ravages of addiction, the ubiquity of gun violence. . . .  In “Sollers Point,” Porterfield reaches a synthesis of his efforts, or, rather, reaches a new stage of his art—the film is endowed with a quietly turbulent and complex fusion of personal observation and candid pain, local specificity and a wide-spectrum vision of politics at large."

The film was named a Critic's Pick by the New York Times and one of the 10 Best Movies of the Year by Vanity Fair. In his Vanity Fair recap, K. Austin Collins called Sollers Point "a subtle, razor-sharp portrait of working-class Baltimore" featuring "a wide-angle, all-encompassing sense of community" and "a star-making performance" by Lombardi.

References

Externals
 
 

2017 films
English-language French films
American drama films
French drama films
American independent films
French independent films
2010s English-language films
2010s American films
2010s French films